Fort Pickett is a Virginia Army National Guard installation, located near the town of Blackstone, Virginia. Home of the Army National Guard Maneuver Training Center, Fort Pickett is named for the United States Army officer and Confederate General George Pickett. It is one of the U.S. Army installations named for Confederate soldiers to be renamed by The Naming Commission. Their recommendation is that the post be renamed Fort  Barfoot; On 5 January 2023 William A. LaPlante, US under-secretary of defense for acquisition and sustainment (USD (A&S)) directed the full implementation of the recommendations of the Naming Commission, DoD-wide. the post is to be redesignated Fort  Barfoot on 24 March 2023.

Beginnings 
Late in 1941 a team of Army surveyors visited the site of a former Civilian Conservation Corps camp near the small rural town of Blackstone, Virginia. There they found enough land, water and other resources needed to establish a post large enough to simultaneously train more than one infantry division. The site also offered easy railroad access to both mountain and coastal training sites. By December, 1941,  of land in Nottoway, Dinwiddie, Lunenburg and Brunswick Counties were acquired and cleared to prepare for construction of the first buildings.

Elements of the Virginia National Guard had their first taste of what is now Fort Pickett on Dec. 6–7 when the 1st Battalion, 116th Infantry, camped here on the way back to its home station at Fort Meade, Maryland, having completed a series of war games in North Carolina.

World War II 
Two rail spurs were built into the camp in 1942–1943 to increase logistical efficiency and the rapid movement of troops on and off post. Air transportation to and from Pickett became available with the completion of a Blackstone Army Airfield in late 1942. The tower was placed beside the only hangar built on post, and its steel beam frames and cinder block foundation are still visible today. Since each cement runway was 5,269 feet long and 300 feet wide, the four-runway airfield was large enough to allow the safe landing of the Douglas C-47 "Gooney Bird." Fighter planes could use the runway in an emergency, although none were stationed at the airfield. Aircraft fuel was delivered by rail and contained in fuel trucks, since permanent storage tanks were not constructed until after World War II. The airfield remained virtually unchanged until the 1990s.

By the end of 1942, more than 1,400 buildings were completed and in use across the post, including approximately 1,000 enlisted barracks and 70 officer's quarters. Twelve chapels, the post hospital complex (later greatly expanded) and six firehouses were built, along with warehouses, headquarters and administrative buildings. To assure an adequate water supply for the post and its potential 60,000-soldier population, the Army built and maintained its own water pumping, filtration and sewage treatment plants. In the 1980s the Army transferred control and operation of these facilities to the town of Blackstone.

For recreation, there were four movie theaters (two more were added later), a field house with a gym, several enlisted clubs, a main post exchange and several "satellite" PXs. By the war's end, more than 300 additional buildings were constructed, including a female barracks and facilities for two prisoner-of-war camps.

Cold War and beyond 

Although Camp Pickett seemed destined to once again be closed after the conclusion of the war, the demands of the Cold War and the need to train division-sized reserve component units in the mid-Atlantic region brought a redefined role for the post. In 1950 the 43rd Infantry Division, a national guard division from New England, was activated and sent to Camp Pickett for additional training. In 1951 this division was sent to Germany as part of the Army of Occupation  In 1960, portions of Camp Pickett were being revamped to house battalions coming for a week or two each year to conduct specialized training. This included not only Guard/Reserve commands, but also Navy and Marine Corps personnel. These components still use Pickett's facilities today under Virginia National Guard control.

The predecessor to the Virginia National Guard Maneuver Training Center was organized and stationed at Pickett in 1961. Its primary mission, then as now, was to store and maintain pieces of equipment such as tanks and other armored vehicles that visiting units could use, rather than incurring the high cost of bringing their own machines from home station.

Pickett experienced two significant interrelated events in 1974. The first was its redesignation from "Camp" to "Fort Pickett" as a reflection of its new mission to offer training opportunities, not only to Reserve units, but also active duty forces on a yearly basis. The second important event was the completion of the first new building on the post since the Korean War. Building 467 contained space to house enlisted personnel, a mess facility, and administrative offices. It was built of brick.

Ten years later, a new complex of barracks and support structures was completed. Large enough to house an entire brigade, the complex was dedicated June 8, 1984, in memory of Tech. Sgt. Frank D. Peregory of the 116th Infantry, 40 years to the day after he earned the Medal of Honor during the D-Day invasion. Other upgrades of facilities included a doubling of the existing telephone system from 2,600 to 5,100 lines in 1991 and renovation and extension of the Blackstone Army Airfield's runways in 1994 to allow use by C-130 and C-17 transport aircraft. This permitted easy access for airmobile troops and equipment coming to Fort Pickett for training.

In more recent years, other structures were added or converted to meet the post's changing missions. Among these were a new firehouse and renovations on the remaining NCO Club, making it more of a community center where local town events as well as post functions are held. Good community relations have always been important to the success of Fort Pickett. From its very beginning, the post has dramatically changed the lives of the citizens of Blackstone. It has created a number of good jobs and supported the town in a variety of other ways, from hosting elderly fishing trips at the on-post lakes to Fourth of July celebrations. Boy and Girl Scouts organizations also have camped, fished and hiked the nature trails for many years. Currently, many activities attract a large number of local citizens and former staff and personnel who had been stationed there during the war.

Fort Pickett is also the home of an annual exercise with elements of 36 Canadian Brigade Group, located in Nova Scotia and Prince Edward Island. Exercise "Southbound Trooper" is a joint exercise between the Canadian Forces Primary Reserves and Virginia National Guard that helps forge solid NATO doctrine between the two militaries. Soldiers from 37 Canadian Brigade, located in New Brunswick and Newfoundland also hold an annual exercise "Maritime Raider", usually shortly after Southbound Trooper.

While the facilities at Pickett are geared to train military personnel and units, non-military organizations use them too. These include the U.S. Department of State, the United States Marshals Service, FBI, ATF, the Virginia Wing of the Civil Air Patrol, Virginia State Police and local law enforcement agencies.

The decision to inactivate the regular Army garrison at Fort Pickett and turn over operation of the post to the Virginia National Guard was finalized in 1995 and enacted in 1997. Since that time no regular Army personnel have been assigned to Pickett for the first time since January 1942.

The 183rd Regiment maintains the Virginia RTI at Fort Pickett.

Today Fort Pickett has 42,000 acres of Maneuver areas and provides many state of the art facilities such as live fire range, a forward operation base, urban assault, training villages, EST 2000 and several other training facilities.

References

External links 
 Fort Pickett (GlobalSecurity.org)
 Fort Pickett Army National Guard Maneuver Training Center
 The Camp Pickett News

Brunswick County, Virginia
Dinwiddie County, Virginia
Pickett
Lunenburg County, Virginia
Buildings and structures in Nottoway County, Virginia
Civilian Conservation Corps in Virginia
Installations of the United States Army National Guard
1942 establishments in Virginia
Military installations established in 1942